Archibald "Archie" Brown (2 November 1894 – death unknown) was a Welsh rugby union and professional rugby league footballer who played in the 1910s and 1920s.

Background
Brown was born in Crosskeys, Wales.

Playing career

International honours
Archie Brown won a cap for Wales (RU) while at Newport RFC in 1921 against Ireland. he also played for the All International XV against Bristol in 1921.

County Cup Final appearances
Archie Brown played  in Leeds' 11-3 victory over Dewsbury in the 1921 Yorkshire County Cup Final during the 1921–22 season at Thrum Hall, Halifax on Saturday 26 November 1921.

Club career
Archie Brown made his début for Leeds against Featherstone Rovers at Headingley Rugby Stadium, Leeds on Monday 29 August 1921.

References

External links
Search for "Brown" at rugbyleagueproject.org

Statistics at scrum.com
Statistics at wru.co.uk
Profile at blackandambers.co.uk

1894 births
Year of death missing
Cross Keys RFC players
Dewsbury Rams players
Footballers who switched code
Leeds Rhinos players
Newport RFC players
Risca RFC players
Rugby league halfbacks
Rugby league players from Caerphilly County Borough
Rugby union players from Crosskeys
Rugby union scrum-halves
Wales international rugby union players
Welsh rugby league players
Welsh rugby union players